The PowerBook Duo 210 is a portable subnotebook personal computer, manufactured by Apple Computer Inc. and introduced in October 1992. Priced at US$2250, the PowerBook Duo 210 was the low-end model of the two simultaneously released PowerBook Duos (the PowerBook Duo 230 was priced at US$2610). The specifications of the PowerBook Duo 210 are almost identical to the PowerBook 160, except that the PowerBook Duo 210 has a smaller display (9.1 inch). Its case design is identical to the PowerBook Duo 230, but it shipped with 25 MHz Motorola 68030, instead of the faster 33 MHz 68030 on the Duo 230. The PowerBook Duo 210 had a 80MB SCSI Hard Disk Drive. It was discontinued on October 21, 1993.

Specifications 
Processor: Motorola 68030 CPU running at 25 MHz
Floating Point Unit: None
RAM: 4 MB, expandable to 28 MB via a DRAM card
Hard disk: 80 MB
Floppy disk: None
Systems Supported: 7.1-7.6.1
ADB: No
Serial: 1 Mini-DIN-8 (includes LocalTalk)
Modem: optional
Expansion: external 152 pin Processor Direct Slot, used for a docking station
Screen: 9.1" 4-bit grayscale passive matrix LCD, 640×400 resolution

Timeline

References

Duo 210